The 2010–11 Danish 2nd Divisions, beginning on 7 August 2010 and ending on 11 June 2011, will be the divided in two groups of sixteen teams. The two group winners will face each other for a single promotion spot in a two-legged play-off, rather than the normal three promotion spots, as decided in March 2010. This is done to reduce the First Division from 16 to 14 and eventually 12 teams. The bottom team from each group will be relegated, along with the loser of a two-legged play-off tie between the two clubs taking the penultimate spot at the end of the season.

Because of an uneven distribution of West and East-teams (divided by the Great Belt), two East-teams, Boldklubben 1908 and Rishøj Boldklub, were drawn into the West-division (originally three with Greve as the third, but the bankruptcy of BK Frem mentioned below reduced the number to two).

Shortly before the season, Boldklubben Frem, who were one of the three relegated teams from the First Division, went bankrupt and were relegated to the Copenhagen Series. This meant that otherwise relegated Otterup were awarded Frem's place in the tournament.

Participants

East

League table

West

League table

Play-offs

Promotion game
The two winners will play promotion game on home and away basis.

References

Danish 2nd Division seasons
3
Danish